Afro/American Sketches is a jazz album by Oliver Nelson recorded in late 1961 and released in 1962. It is his first big band album as a leader.

In a June 7, 1962, review for Down Beat magazine jazz critic Richard B. Hadlock said this of Nelson: "In his penchant for melodic simplicity and inner complexity he is close to the secret of Duke Ellington's most enduring scores, and in his thick linear voicings there are echoes of Gil Evans at his best."

Track listing 
All tracks composed by Nelson.

 "Message" – 5:56
 "Jungleaire" – 6:33
 "Emancipation Blues" – 8:11
 "There's a Yearnin'" – 4:24
 "Going Up North" – 6:11
 "Disillusioned" – 5:36
 "Freedom Dance" – 4:39

Recorded on September 29 (#1, 3, 4, 6, 7) and November 10 (#2, 5), 1961.

Personnel 
Tracks 2, 5
Oliver Nelson – arranger, alto saxophone, tenor saxophone
Joe Newman, Clyde Reasinger, Ernie Royal – trumpet
Billy Byers, Paul Faulise, Melba Liston – trombone
Don Butterfield – tuba
Eric Dixon – tenor saxophone, flute
Jerry Dodgion – flute
Art Davis – bass
Ed Shaughnessy – drums
Ray Barretto – congas, bongos

Tracks 1, 3, 4, 6, 7
Oliver Nelson – arranger, alto saxophone, tenor saxophone
Jerry Kail, Joe Newman, Ernie Royal, Joe Wilder – trumpet
Paul Faulise, Urbie Green, Britt Woodman – trombone
Ray Alonge, Jim Buffington, Julius Watkins – French horn
Don Butterfield – tuba
Jerry Dodgion – alto sax, flute
Eric Dixon – tenor saxophone, flute
Bob Ashton – tenor saxophone, flute, clarinet
Patti Bown – piano
Peter Makas, Charles McCracken – violoncello
Art Davis – bass
Ed Shaughnessy – drums
Ray Barretto – congas, bongos

References 

1962 albums
Oliver Nelson albums
Prestige Records albums